The 1979 Florida State Seminoles football team represented Florida State University in the 1979 NCAA Division I-A football season. The team was coached by Bobby Bowden and played their home games at Doak Campbell Stadium.

Florida State finished #6 in the AP poll and #8 in the UPI poll with an 11–1 record.  The Seminoles' offense scored 326 points while the defense allowed 160 points. The Seminoles finished the regular season unbeaten for only the second time in program history and played in the Orange Bowl.

Schedule

Season summary
Mark Lyles led the team in rushing with 1011 yards and 8 touchdowns. Jimmy Jordan led the team in passing with 1173 yards and threw 13 touchdown passes. Jackie Flowers led the team in receiving with 37 catches for 622 yards and 7 TD receptions. Monk Bonasorte led the team with 8 pass interceptions. Bonassorte {DB}, Bobby Butler {DB}, Jackie Flowers {TE}, Mike Good {G}, Ken Lanier {OT}, Ron Simmons {NG} and Scott Warren {DE} were selected to the First team All-South Independent team. Ron Simmons was selected as a First team All-American. Bonasorte was a 3rd team AP All-American. Bobby Butler {DB}, Jackie Flowers, Mike Good, Jimmy Jordan {QB} and Ken Lanier were named as Honorable Mention All-Americans by the Associated Press and/or The Sporting News. Mark Lyles {RB} {Cincinnati}, Flowers {Dallas}, Walter Carter {DT} {Oakland} and Jordan {New England} were selected in the 1980 NFL draft.

Southern Miss

Behind 14-3 with 10 minutes left in the last quarter, Florida State struck for two quick touchdowns and overtook Southern Mississippi 17-14 before 45,467 fans at Doak Campbell Stadium. Jimmy Jordan threw an 8 yard TD pass to Jackie Flowers, then a 65 yard punt return for a touchdown by Gary Henry with 6:28 put the Seminoles in front to stay.

Arizona State

Florida State romped to an easy 31-3 football victory over Arizona State. It was 24-0 at halftime. Monk Bonasorte helped to provide 10 first half points with two interceptions. Wally Woodham threw 18 yards to Jackie Flowers for a touchdown. Mark Lyles ran 1 yard for a touchdown to give FSU a 14-0 lead. Dave Cappelen kicked a 42 yard field goal and Jimmy Jordan threw his first of two touchdown passes, an 8 yard pass to Grady King. In the 4th quarter he threw 15 yards to Ricky Williams for the final Seminole touchdown.

Miami (FL)

Miami jumped out to an early lead after the first quarter, but that would pretty much be all they could celebrate during this day in the Capital City. Two Mark Lyles touchdowns in the second quarter helped the Seminoles take a 19-7 lead at the half, while Greg Ramsey would add two rushing scores in the third quarter and the route was on. The Hurricanes scored a touchdown to open the fourth quarter, but Gary Henry’s return of a blocked punt cemented the outcome and Florida State was able to celebrate in their own locker room after defeating the Hurricanes at home for the first time, 40-23, pacing the Noles to the first undefeated regular season under Bobby Bowden.

Virginia Tech
It was Virginia Tech's last chance to win. Fourth down and 13 at its 17. As Steve Casey rolled to pass, Seminole linebacker Paul Piurowski was bearing down on him. Casey slipped as he tried to maneuver, and Piurowski was on top of him at the 12 and the Florida State held on for a 17-10 victory. Trailing 7-0 in the 2nd quarter, the Seminoles struck on a Greg Ramsey 16 yard run and Jackie Flowers 18 yard TD pass from Jimmy Jordan. Dave Cappelen added a 20 yard field goal in the 3rd quarter. Wally Woodham and Jimmy Jordan combined for 322 yards passing, but threw 4 interceptions.

Louisville

Blocking two punts, holding Louisville to just two first downs until 7:30 was left on the clock, Florida State's defense was again the dominant show as the unbeaten Seminoles won 27-0. FSU did it on two touchdowns, a couple of safeties and a field goal before 27,306 fans at Fairgrounds Stadium. Wally Woodham threw two touchdowns, one to Sam Platt (5 yards) and one to Sam Childers (1 yard). Bobby Butler fell on a blocked punt in the end zone for a touchdown.

Mississippi State

Putting two touchdowns on the scoreboard in the final six minutes of the first half, Florida State held on with its defense in the closing two quarters and claimed a 17-6 victory over Mississippi State. FSU scored on a one yard run by Mike Whiting, and on an 18 yard pass from Jimmy Jordan to Jackie Flowers. Dave Cappelen kicked a 46 yard field goal.

LSU

Jimmy Jordan gunned three touchdown passes as Florida State muscled past Louisiana State 24-19 before 67,197 in Tiger Stadium. Jordan completed 14 passes for 312 yards. In the 1st half, the Seminoles forced three LSU fumbles and recovered all three. Florida State, in the 2nd half, intercepted two passes. Monk Bonasorte recovered a fumble and intercepted two passes. Florida State totaled 436 yards of offense. Jordan’s TD passes went to Sam Platt (3 yards), Jackie Flowers (40 yards) and Hardis Johnson (53 yards).

Cincinnati

The sixth ranked Seminoles squeezed past Cincinnati 26-21 when Mike Whiting crashed into the end zone from eight yards out with 1:38 left to play. The Seminoles trailed 21-7 at the start of the fourth quarter. Ahead 7-0 after their first offensive series, FSU was stunned by a 21 point 2nd quarter onslaught by Cincinnati, a 17 1/2 point underdog. Wally Woodham led the charge in the 4th quarter with touchdown passes to Mark Lyles (7 yards) and Jackie Flowers (5 yards), followed by Whiting’s game winner.

South Carolina

A record Doak Campbell Stadium crowd of 49,490 saw the 9-0 Seminoles beat South Carolina 27-7. Wally Woodham completed 15 of 25 passes for 145 yards. Florida State nominated possession, 83 plays to 52, and totaled 381 yards to Carolina's 265. Mark Lyles ran for 132 yards on 25 carries and a 1 yard touchdown run. Dave Capellen kicked four field goals. Jimmy Jordan threw a 7 yard TD pass to Sam Childers.

Memphis State

Florida State clobbered Memphis State 66-17 before 48,021 at Doak Campbell Stadium. Memphis State's defense had given up just three touchdown passes. Quarterback Jimmy Jordan threw for that many in the second quarter. Two of those Jordan TD shots came in the last 45 seconds of the half, stretching a 10-3 lead to 24-3. Jordan’s touchdown passes were to Jackie Flowers (24 yards), Hardis Johnson (4 yards) and Grady King (5 yards). The defense and special teams got their shots in as well with Paul Piurowski returning an interception 29 yards for a touchdown and Keith Jones returning a blocked punt (by Bobby Butler) 16 yards for a touchdown. Mark Lyles, Ricky Williams, Keith Kennedy and Kelly Burney ran for touchdowns for the Noles.

at Florida

Florida hosted Florida State at Florida Field in a regionally televised contest on ABC-TV. A debatable ruling on an interception by FSU’s Walter Carter led to a Bill Capece field goal that gave the Seminoles a 20-10 lead in the fourth quarter. The game had been tied 10-10 early in the final period. Mark Lyles’ two fourth quarter touchdowns however, would be just what the Seminoles needed as FSU completed a perfect regular season. Lyles rushed for 151 yards while teammate Michael Whiting added 123 yards on the ground. Defensively, Florida State forced six turnovers for their third straight victory over rival Florida. The Noles went on to a 27-16 victory.

Orange Bowl

Mike Whiting gave the Seminoles a lead with his touchdown run, but that was their only score of the night. A fumbled field goal snap, three turnovers, over 100 yards of rushing by quarterback J. C. Watts and halfback Billy Sims, and 24 unanswered points by Oklahoma doomed the Seminoles. It all started with a Watts run for a touchdown in the second quarter to tie the game at seven. After the kickoff, the Seminoles turned the ball over on an interception, giving the ball back to Oklahoma. Stanley Wilson then scored a touchdown run to make it 14–7. Mike Keeling added a field goal late in the quarter to give the Sooners a 17–7 lead at halftime. The second half scoring was limited to one Oklahoma touchdown from 22 yards out in the fourth quarter; Watts ran for twelve yards before pitching the ball to Sims, who took it the rest of the way for a 24–7 lead, the final score. The Sooners ran for 411 yards on 59 carries, an average of nearly seven yards per attempt, while having twice as many total yards as the Seminoles.

Roster

Awards and honors

Monk Bonasorte
Associated Press – 3rd Team All-American

Bobby Butler
Associated Press – All-American – Honorable Mention

Jackie Flowers
Football News – 2nd Team All-American
United Press International – 2nd Team All-American
Associated Press – All-American – Honorable Mention
The Sporting News – All-American – Honorable Mention

Mike Good
Associated Press – All-American – Honorable Mention

Ken Lanier
Associated Press – All-American – Honorable Mention

Ron Simmons
American Football Coaches Association – 1st Team All-American
Associated Press – 1st Team All-American
Walter Camp – 1st Team All-American
Football News – 1st Team All-American
Kodak – 1st Team All-American
United Press International – 1st Team All-American
NCAA – Consensus All-American
The Sporting News – All-American – Honorable Mention

Scott Warren 
Churchman's – 1st Team All-American
Associated Press – All-American – Honorable Mention

References

Florida State
Florida State Seminoles football seasons
Florida State Seminoles football